State Route 64 (SR 64) is a  state highway in the northern part of the US state of Arizona. It travels from its western terminus in Williams to its intersection with U.S. Route 89 (US 89) in Cameron.

Route description
SR 64 serves as the entrance road to the South Rim of Grand Canyon National Park; from Williams to Grand Canyon Village, the highway travels from the south to north, and from Grand Canyon Village to Cameron, it travels from the west to the east. While the road is technically not considered a state highway within national park boundaries, as it is maintained there by the National Park Service and not the Arizona Department of Transportation, it is marked as SR 64 on most maps and is considered unbroken for the purposes of numbering in the Arizona state highway system. SR 64 formerly extended past Cameron through to Teec Nos Pos; this designation has been superseded by US 160.

From Tusayan to Valle, the highway travels concurrent with US 180; segments of the highway are also known as Navahopi Road, Rim Drive, and Bushmaster Memorial Highway.

History
SR 64 was first designated as a state highway in 1932 as a route from Williams to the Grand Canyon. In 1935, the highway was extended to the east from the Grand Canyon to US 89. In 1961, the highway was extended further east from US 89 through Tuba City to the New Mexico state line. In 1965, the portion from Teec Nos Pos was renumbered to SR 504 to match New Mexico, which would be renumbered again in 1987 to US 64. In 1965, the section to the east of US 89 became US 164, and would later be renumbered to US 160 in 1969.

Junction list

References

External links

 SR 64 – Arizona Roads

064
U.S. Route 64
Transportation in Coconino County, Arizona
Grand Canyon, South Rim